Chremslach (singular chremsl or khremzl), is a Jewish food eaten on Passover. Chremslach are small thick pancakes or fritters made of potato or matzah meal. Chremslach can also be more dessert-like, including ingredients like dried fruit and nuts.

Similar dishes, or even the same, have different names. Balkan Jews use the Ladino term bimuelos "fritters", cognate with Spanish buñuelos.

See also 
List of Jewish cuisine dishes
Delicatessen

References

External links
Passover chremslach . Retrieved on 1 May 2009
Russian recipe for chremslach (хремзлах) . Retrieved on 1 May 2009

Passover foods
Yiddish words and phrases
Pancakes
Ashkenazi Jewish cuisine